David Michael dos Santos Miranda (born 10 May 1985) is a Brazilian politician. He is a Federal Congressman representing the state of Rio de Janeiro, sworn in on 1 February 2019, and affiliated to the Democratic Labour Party (PDT), after switching parties from the Socialism and Liberty Party (PSOL) in 2022. Prior to that, he was a City Councilman representing the city of Rio de Janeiro.

In 2019, Miranda was named by Time magazine as one of the world's next generation of new leaders.

Activism and political work
Miranda led the campaign for the Brazilian government to grant political asylum to Edward Snowden and worked with his husband, American journalist Glenn Greenwald to publish the revelations contained in Snowden's leaks detailing mass surveillance by the National Security Agency (NSA). He met with Luciana Genro, the PSOL candidate for the 2014 Brazilian presidential election, and obtained her commitment to extend asylum to Snowden if elected. Numerous public Brazilian figures supported the campaign, which failed to convince the government of Dilma Rousseff.

In August 2013, Miranda was detained over his work on the NSA program for nine hours by the British government at London's Heathrow Airport under Schedule 7 of the Terrorism Act 2000, after he had flown in from Berlin and was changing to a plane bound for Rio de Janeiro. His belongings were seized, including an external hard drive which, according to Greenwald, contained sensitive documents relevant to Greenwald's reporting, and which was encrypted with TrueCrypt encryption software. Greenwald described his partner's detention as "clearly intended to send a message of intimidation to those of us who have been reporting on the NSA and GCHQ". Miranda described his treatment by the UK authorities as "psychological torture". In 2014, Miranda interviewed Jair Bolsonaro for an article by Greenwald in The Intercept. At the time, Bolsonaro was a former army captain and a little known representative.

In 2016, Miranda and his friend Marielle Franco, were elected as the first LGBT councillors in Rio's history. Miranda focuses primarily on the issues of the LGBT community and other marginalized segments of the Rio population. Miranda and his family have travelled in a bulletproof car since Franco was assassinated in March 2018.

In 2018, Miranda was elected as a substitute for PSOL deputy Jean Wyllys. When Wyllys, an LGBT member, announced in January 2019 that he had left the country due to death threats, Miranda, who was also a PSOL member, took Wyllys' place in the Chamber of Deputies. After taking his seat, Miranda began to receive "hundreds" of death threats. Joice Hasselmann, a representative of the now-President Bolsonaro's party, accused Miranda of buying his seat. Due to the intimidation from Hasselmann and Bolsonaro supporters during the Vaza Jato reporting Greenwald was engaged in, Miranda disclosed that he had begun taking anti-depressants and that he and Greenwald rarely leave their home, and then only with hired bodyguards.

On January 22, 2022, Miranda announced he was leaving the PSOL and joining the Democratic Labour Party (PDT) and endorsing its leader Ciro Gomes in the 2022 Brazilian general election.

Personal life
Miranda was raised in Jacarezinho, Rio de Janeiro. His mother died when he was five, and he moved in with an aunt. He left home when he was 13, dropped out of school, and worked in menial jobs for the next 6 years. He was playing volleyball on Ipanema beach in February 2005 when he knocked over the drink of Glenn Greenwald. The couple moved in together within a week.

Soon after they first met, Greenwald encouraged Miranda's return to education and he graduated from Escola Superior de Propaganda e Marketing (ESPM) in 2014. Both Greenwald and Miranda are openly gay, and are married. In 2017, the couple adopted two children who are siblings.

Controversies

On 11 September 2019, O Globo newspaper reported that an investigation by a division of the Brazilian Ministry of the Economy identified R$2.5 million in suspicious transactions in Miranda's personal bank account during a one year period from 2018 to 2019, including deposits from current and former employees. As a result, the Public Ministry opened an investigation into his finances. According to media reports, investigators suspect Miranda of "concealing the origin" of the funds and participating in an illegal practice known as "", in which public servants employed in the offices of elected officials kick back a portion of their salary to their boss. Jair Bolsonaro's sons, Flavio Bolsonaro and Carlos Bolsonaro, are also under investigation for this practice.

Glenn Greenwald accused the Brazilian Public Ministry, which represents prosecutors, of launching the investigation and leaking it for political reasons, due to his involvement in uncovering corruption and political bias among Brazilian prosecutors and judges involved in the Lava Jato operation.

2018 center-left presidential candidate Ciro Gomes and center-right pundit Reinaldo Azevedo both described the investigation against Miranda as borne out of a spirit of police state and political persecution.

A few days afterwards, Miranda and Greenwald opened their bank accounts for public access, and challenged the Bolsonaro family to follow suit.

References

External links

Official website (in Portuguese)

1985 births
Living people
Afro-Brazilian people
Brazilian politicians of African descent
LGBT Afro-Brazilians
Gay politicians
Brazilian LGBT journalists
Brazilian LGBT politicians
Democratic Labour Party (Brazil) politicians
Members of the Chamber of Deputies (Brazil) from Rio de Janeiro (state)
Municipal Chamber of Rio de Janeiro councillors
LGBT legislators
21st-century LGBT people